Gouesnac'h is a commune in the Finistère department and administrative region of Brittany in north-western France.

Geography
The small village of Gouesnac'h is located between the Quimper (mediaeval town)/Bénodet (seaside resort) road and the wonderful Odet River.

Map

History
Celtic presence before the Roman invasion.
Roman defensive place.
Medieval activities and several Catholic foundations.

Sights
With breath-taking views of the entire area, the Boutiguéry Park is dedicated to rhododendrons (30,000 plants) and azaleas.

Church Saint-Pierre-et-Saint-Paul (1630)
Chapel Notre-Dame du Vray Secours (1729)
Chapel Sainte-Barbe (ruins)
Chapel Saint-Cadou (1578)
Chapel Saint-Maudet
5th-7th centuries oratorio (ruins)
Saint-Herbot's oratorio (16th century)

Population
Inhabitants of Gouesnac'h are known in French as Gouesnachais.

See also
Communes of the Finistère department

References

External links

Official website 

Mayors of Finistère Association 

Communes of Finistère